

Events

Pre-1600
 226 – Cao Rui succeeds his father as emperor of the Kingdom of Wei.
1149 – Raymond of Poitiers is defeated and killed at the Battle of Inab by Nur ad-Din Zangi.
1194 – Sverre is crowned King of Norway, leading to his excommunication by the Catholic Church and civil war.
1444 – Skanderbeg defeats an Ottoman invasion force at Torvioll.
1457 – The Dutch city of Dordrecht is devastated by fire
1534 – Jacques Cartier is the first European to reach Prince Edward Island.

1601–1900
1613 – The Globe Theatre in London, built by William Shakespeare playing company, the Lord Chamberlain's Men, burns to the ground.
1620 – English crown bans tobacco growing in England, giving the Virginia Company a monopoly in exchange for tax of one shilling per pound. 
1644 – Charles I of England defeats a Parliamentarian detachment at the Battle of Cropredy Bridge.
1659 – At the Battle of Konotop the Ukrainian armies of Ivan Vyhovsky defeat the Russians led by Prince Trubetskoy.
1786 – Alexander Macdonell and over five hundred Roman Catholic highlanders leave Scotland to settle in Glengarry County, Ontario.
1807 – Russo-Turkish War: Admiral Dmitry Senyavin destroys the Ottoman fleet in the Battle of Athos.
1850 – Autocephaly officially granted by the Ecumenical Patriarchate of Constantinople to the Church of Greece.
1864 – At least 99 people, mostly German and Polish immigrants, are killed in Canada's worst railway disaster after a train fails to stop for an open drawbridge and plunges into the Rivière Richelieu near St-Hilaire, Quebec.
1874 – Greek politician Charilaos Trikoupis publishes a manifesto in the Athens daily Kairoi entitled "Who's to Blame?" leveling complaints against King George. Trikoupis is elected Prime Minister of Greece the next year.
1880 – France annexes Tahiti, renaming the independent Kingdom of Tahiti as "Etablissements de français de l'Océanie".
1881 – In Sudan, Muhammad Ahmad declares himself to be the Mahdi, the messianic redeemer of Islam.
1888 – George Edward Gouraud records Handel's Israel in Egypt onto a phonograph cylinder, thought for many years to be the oldest known recording of music.
1889 – Hyde Park and several other Illinois townships vote to be annexed by Chicago, forming the largest United States city in area and second largest in population at the time.

1901–present
1915 – The North Saskatchewan River flood of 1915 is the worst flood in Edmonton history.
1916 – British diplomat turned Irish nationalist Roger Casement is sentenced to death for his part in the Easter Rising.
1922 – France grants "one square kilometer" at Vimy Ridge "freely, and for all time, to the Government of Canada, the free use of the land exempt from all taxes".
1927 – The Bird of Paradise, a U.S. Army Air Corps Fokker tri-motor, completes the first transpacific flight, from the mainland United States to Hawaii.
1945 – The Soviet Union annexes the Czechoslovak province of Carpathian Ruthenia.
1950 – Korean War: U.S. President Harry S. Truman authorizes a sea blockade of Korea.
1952 – The first Miss Universe pageant is held. Armi Kuusela from Finland wins the title of Miss Universe 1952.
1956 – The Federal Aid Highway Act of 1956 is signed by U.S. President Dwight D. Eisenhower, officially creating the United States Interstate Highway System.
1971 – Prior to re-entry (following a record-setting stay aboard the Soviet Union’s Salyut 1 space station), the crew capsule of the Soyuz 11 spacecraft depressurizes, killing the three cosmonauts on board. Georgy Dobrovolsky, Vladislav Volkov and Viktor Patsayev are the first humans to die in space.
1972 – The United States Supreme Court rules in the case Furman v. Georgia that arbitrary and inconsistent imposition of the death penalty violates the Eighth and Fourteenth Amendments and constitutes cruel and unusual punishment.
  1972   – A Convair CV-580 and De Havilland Canada DHC-6 Twin Otter collide above Lake Winnebago near Appleton, Wisconsin, killing 13.
1974 – Vice President Isabel Perón assumes powers and duties as Acting President of Argentina, while her husband President Juan Perón is terminally ill. 
  1974   – Mikhail Baryshnikov defects from the Soviet Union to Canada while on tour with the Kirov Ballet.
1976 – The Seychelles become independent from the United Kingdom.
  1976   – The Conference of Communist and Workers Parties of Europe convenes in East Berlin.
1987 – Vincent van Gogh's painting, the Le Pont de Trinquetaille, is bought for $20.4 million at an auction in London, England.
1995 – Space Shuttle program: STS-71 Mission (Atlantis) docks with the Russian space station Mir for the first time.
  1995   – The Sampoong Department Store collapses in the Seocho District of Seoul, South Korea, killing 501 and injuring 937.
2002 – Naval clashes between South Korea and North Korea lead to the death of six South Korean sailors and sinking of a North Korean vessel.
2006 – Hamdan v. Rumsfeld: The U.S. Supreme Court rules that President George W. Bush's plan to try Guantanamo Bay detainees in military tribunals violates U.S. and international law.
2007 – Apple Inc. releases its first mobile phone, the iPhone.
2012 – A derecho sweeps across the eastern United States, leaving at least 22 people dead and millions without power.
2014 – The Islamic State of Iraq and the Levant self-declares its caliphate in Syria and northern Iraq.

Births

Pre-1600
1136 – Petronilla of Aragon (d. 1173)
1326 – Murad I, Ottoman Sultan (d. 1389)
1398 – John II of Aragon and Navarre (d. 1479)
1443 – Anthony Browne, English knight (d. 1506)
1482 – Maria of Aragon, Queen of Portugal (d. 1517)
1488 – Pedro Pacheco de Villena, Catholic cardinal (d. 1560)
1517 – Rembert Dodoens, Flemish physician and botanist (d. 1585)
1525 – Peter Agricola, German humanist, theologian, diplomat and statesman (d. 1585)
1528 – Julius, Duke of Brunswick-Lüneburg (d. 1589)
1543 – Christine of Hesse, Duchess consort of Holstein-Gottorp (d. 1604)
1596 – Emperor Go-Mizunoo of Japan (d. 1680)

1601–1900
1621 – Willem van der Zaan, Dutch Admiral (d. 1669)
1686 – Pietro Paolo Troisi, Maltese artist (d. 1743)
1746 – Joachim Heinrich Campe, German linguist, author, and educator (d. 1818)
1768 – Vincenzo Dimech, Maltese sculptor (d. 1831)
1787 – Lavinia Stoddard, American poet, school founder (d. 1820)
1793 – Josef Ressel, Czech-Austrian inventor, invented the propeller (d. 1857)
1798 – Willibald Alexis, German author and poet (d. 1871)
  1798   – Giacomo Leopardi, Italian poet and philosopher (d. 1837)
1801 – Frédéric Bastiat, French economist and theorist (d. 1850)
1803 – John Newton Brown, American minister and author (d. 1868)
1818 – Angelo Secchi, Italian astronomer and academic (d. 1878)
1819 – Thomas Dunn English, American poet, playwright, and politician (d. 1902)
1833 – Peter Waage, Norwegian chemist and academic (d. 1900)
1835 – Celia Thaxter, American poet and story writer (d. 1894)
1844 – Peter I of Serbia (d. 1921)
1849 – Pedro Montt, Chilean lawyer and politician, 15th President of Chile (d. 1910)
  1849   – Sergei Witte, Russian politician, 1st Chairmen of Council of Ministers of the Russian Empire (d. 1915)
  1849   – John Hunn, American businessman and politician, 51st Governor of Delaware (d. 1926)
1858 – George Washington Goethals, American general and engineer, co-designed the Panama Canal (d. 1928)
  1858   – Julia Lathrop, American activist and politician (d. 1932)
1861 – William James Mayo, American physician and surgeon, co-founded the Mayo Clinic (d. 1939)
1863 – Wilbert Robinson, American baseball player, coach, and manager (d. 1934)
1866 – Bartholomeus Roodenburch, Dutch swimmer (d. 1939)
1868 – George Ellery Hale, American astronomer and journalist (d. 1938)
1870 – Joseph Carl Breil, American tenor, composer, and director (d. 1926)
1873 – Leo Frobenius, German ethnologist and archaeologist (d. 1938)
1879 – Benedetto Aloisi Masella, Italian cardinal (d. 1970)
1880 – Ludwig Beck, German general (d. 1944)
1881 – Harry Frazee, American director, producer, and agent (d. 1929)
  1881   – Curt Sachs, German-American composer and musicologist (d. 1959)
1882 – Henry Hawtrey, English runner (d. 1961)
  1882   – Franz Seldte, German captain and politician, Reich Minister for Labour (d. 1947)
1885 – Izidor Kürschner, Hungarian football player and coach (d. 1941)
1886 – Robert Schuman, Luxembourgian-French lawyer and politician, Prime Minister of France (d. 1963)
1888 – Squizzy Taylor, Australian gangster (d. 1927)
1889 – Willie Macfarlane, Scottish-American golfer (d. 1961)
1890 – Robert Laurent, American sculptor and academic (d. 1970)
  1890   – Hendrikje van Andel-Schipper, Dutch supercentenarian (d. 2005)
1893 – Prasanta Chandra Mahalanobis, Indian economist and statistician (d. 1972)
  1893   – Aarre Merikanto, Finnish composer and educator (d. 1958)
1897 – Fulgence Charpentier, Canadian journalist and publisher (d. 2001)
1898 – Yvonne Lefébure, French pianist and educator (d. 1986)
1900 – Antoine de Saint-Exupéry, French poet and pilot (d. 1944)

1901–present
1901 – Nelson Eddy, American singer and actor (d. 1967)
1903 – Alan Blumlein, English engineer, developed the H2S radar (d. 1942)
1904 – Witold Hurewicz, Polish mathematician (d. 1956)
1906 – Ivan Chernyakhovsky, Ukrainian general (d. 1945)
  1906   – Heinz Harmel, German general (d. 2000)
1908 – Leroy Anderson, American composer and conductor (d. 1975)
  1908   – Erik Lundqvist, Swedish javelin thrower (d. 1963)
1910 – Frank Loesser, American composer and conductor (d. 1969)
  1910   – Burgess Whitehead, American baseball player (d. 1993)
1911 – Prince Bernhard of Lippe-Biesterfeld (d. 2004)
  1911   – Katherine DeMille, Canadian-American actress (d. 1995)
  1911   – Bernard Herrmann, American composer and conductor (d. 1975)
1912 – José Pablo Moncayo, Mexican pianist, composer, and conductor (d. 1958)
  1912   – Émile Peynaud, French oenologist and academic (d. 2004)
  1912   – John Toland, American historian and author (d. 2004)
1913 – Earle Meadows, American pole vaulter (d. 1992)
1914 – Rafael Kubelík, Czech-American conductor and composer (d. 1996)
  1914   – Christos Papakyriakopoulos, Greek-American mathematician and academic (d. 1976)
1916 – Ruth Warrick, American actress and activist (d. 2005)
1917 – Ling Yun, Chinese politician (d. 2018)
1918 – Heini Lohrer, Swiss ice hockey player (d. 2011)
  1918   – Gene La Rocque, U.S admiral (d. 2016)
  1918   – Francis W. Nye, United States Air Force major general (d. 2019)
1919 – Ernesto Corripio y Ahumada, Mexican cardinal (d. 2008)
  1919   – Walter Babington Thomas, Commander of British Far East Land Forces (d. 2017)
  1919   – Juan Blanco, Cuban composer (d. 2008)
  1919   – Slim Pickens, American actor and rodeo performer (d. 1983)
  1919   – Lloyd Richards, Canadian-American theatre director, actor, and dean (d. 2006)
1920 – César Rodríguez Álvarez, Spanish footballer and manager (d. 1995)
  1920   – Ray Harryhausen, American animator and producer (d. 2013)
  1920   – Nicole Russell, Duchess of Bedford (d. 2012)
  1920   – David Snellgrove, British tibetologist (d. 2016)
1921 – Frédéric Dard, French author and screenwriter (d. 2000)
  1921   – Jean Kent, English actress (d. 2013)
  1921   – Reinhard Mohn, German businessman (d. 2009)
  1921   – Harry Schell, French-American race car driver (d. 1960)
1922 – Ralph Burns, American songwriter, bandleader, composer, conductor, arranger and pianist (d. 2001)
  1922   – Vasko Popa, Serbian poet and academic (d. 1991)
  1922   – John William Vessey, Jr., American general (d. 2016)
1923 – Chou Wen-chung, Chinese-American composer and educator (d. 2019)
1924 – Ezra Laderman, American composer and educator (d. 2015)
  1924   – Roy Walford, American pathologist and gerontologist (d. 2004)
  1924   – Philip H. Hoff, American politician (d. 2018)
1925 – Francis S. Currey, American World War II Medal of Honor recipient (d. 2019)
  1925   – Giorgio Napolitano, Italian journalist and politician, 11th President of Italy
  1925   – Chan Parker, American dancer and author (d. 1999)
  1925   – Jackie Lynn Taylor, American actress (d. 2014)
  1925   – Cara Williams, American actress (d. 2021)
1926 – Jaber Al-Ahmad Al-Sabah, Kuwaiti ruler, 3rd Emir of Kuwait (d. 2006)
  1926   – Julius W. Becton, Jr., U.S lieutenant general
  1926   – Roger Stuart Bacon, Nova Scotia politician
  1926   – Bobby Morgan, American professional baseball player
1927 – Pierre Perrault, Canadian director and screenwriter (d. 1999)
  1927   – Marie Thérèse Killens, Canadian politician
1928 – Ian Bannen, Scottish actor (d. 1999)
  1928   – Jean-Louis Pesch, French author and illustrator
  1928   – Radius Prawiro, Indonesian economist and politician (d. 2005)
1929 – Pat Crawford Brown, American actress (d. 2019)
  1929   – Pete George, American weightlifter (d. 2021)
  1929   – Oriana Fallaci, Italian journalist and author (d. 2006)
1930 – Ernst Albrecht, German economist and politician, 6th Prime Minister of Lower Saxony (d. 2014)
  1930   – Robert Evans, American actor and producer (d. 2019)
  1930   – Viola Léger, American-Canadian actress and politician
  1930   – Sławomir Mrożek, Polish-French author and playwright (d. 2013)
1931 – Sevim Burak, Turkish author (d. 1983)
1932 – Brian Hutton, Baron Hutton, British jurist; Lord Chief Justice of Northern Ireland
1933 – Bob Shaw, American baseball player and manager (d. 2010)
  1933   – John Bradshaw, American theologian and author (d. 2016)
1934 – Corey Allen, American actor, director, and producer (d. 2010)
1935 – Vassilis C. Constantakopoulos, Greek captain and businessman (d. 2011)
  1935   – Katsuya Nomura, Japanese baseball player and manager
1936 – Harmon Killebrew, American baseball player (d. 2011)
1939 – Alan Connolly, Australian cricketer
  1939   – Amarildo Tavares da Silveira, Brazilian footballer and coach
1940 – Vyacheslav Artyomov, Russian composer
  1940   – John Dawes, Welsh rugby player and coach (d. 2021)
1941 – John Boccabella, American baseball player
  1941   – Stokely Carmichael, Trinidadian-American activist (d. 1998)
1942 – Charlotte Bingham, English author and screenwriter
  1942   – Mike Willesee, Australian journalist and producer (d. 2019)
1943 – Little Eva, American singer (d. 2003)
  1943   – Louis Nicollin, French entrepreneur and chairman of Montpellier HSC (d. 2017)
1944 – Gary Busey, American actor 
  1944   – Andreu Mas-Colell, Spanish economist, academic, and politician
  1944   – Seán Patrick O'Malley, American cardinal
1945 – Chandrika Kumaratunga, Sri Lankan journalist and politician, 5th President of Sri Lanka
1946 – Ernesto Pérez Balladares, Panamanian politician, 33rd President of Panama
  1946   – Egon von Fürstenberg, Swiss fashion designer (d. 2004)
1947 – Richard Lewis, American actor and screenwriter
1948 – Sean Bergin, South African-Dutch saxophonist and flute player (d. 2012)
  1948   – Fred Grandy, American actor and politician
  1948   – Ian Paice, English drummer, songwriter, and producer 
  1948   – Usha Prashar, Baroness Prashar, Kenyan-English politician
1949 – Dan Dierdorf, American football player and sportscaster
  1949   – Joan Clos, Spanish anesthesiologist and politician, 116th Mayor of Barcelona
  1949   – Ann Veneman, American lawyer and politician, 27th United States Secretary of Agriculture
1950 – Bobby London, American illustrator
  1950   – Don Moen, American singer and songwriter
1951 – Craig Sager, American sportscaster (d. 2016)
1953 – Don Dokken, American singer-songwriter and guitarist
  1953   – Colin Hay, Scottish-Australian singer and guitarist
1954 – Rick Honeycutt, American baseball player and coach
  1954   – Léo Júnior, Brazilian footballer, coach, and manager
1955 – Charles J. Precourt, American colonel, pilot, and astronaut
1956 – Nick Fry, English economist and businessman
  1956   – David Burroughs Mattingly, American illustrator and painter
  1956   – Pedro Guerrero, Dominican-American baseball player and manager
  1956   – Pedro Santana Lopes, Portuguese lawyer and politician, 118th Prime Minister of Portugal
  1956   – Pyotr Vasilevsky, Belarusian footballer and manager (d. 2012)
1957 – Gurbanguly Berdimuhamedow, Turkmen dentist and politician, 2nd President of Turkmenistan
  1957   – María Conchita Alonso, Cuban-Venezuelan singer and actress
  1957   – Robert Forster, Australian singer-songwriter and guitarist 
  1957   – Michael Nutter, American politician, 98th Mayor of Philadelphia
  1957   – Terry Wyatt, English physicist and academic
1958 – Dieter Althaus, German politician
  1958   – Rosa Mota, Portuguese runner
1961 – Sharon Lawrence, American actress, singer, and dancer
1962 – Amanda Donohoe, English actress
  1962   – Joan Laporta, Spanish lawyer and politician
  1962   – George D. Zamka, American colonel, pilot, and astronaut
1963 – Anne-Sophie Mutter, German violinist
  1963   – Judith Hoag, American actress and educator
1964 – Stedman Pearson, English singer-songwriter and dancer 
1965 – Tripp Eisen, American guitarist 
  1965   – Paul Jarvis, English cricketer
1966 – Yoko Kamio, Japanese author and comic artist
1967 – Jeff Burton, American race car driver
  1967   – Melora Hardin, American actress and singer
  1967   – Seamus McGarvey, Northern Irish cinematographer
1968 – Brian d'Arcy James, American actor and musician
  1968   – Theoren Fleury, Canadian ice hockey player
1969 – Claude Béchard, Canadian politician (d. 2010)
  1969   – Pavlos Dermitzakis, Greek footballer and manager
  1969   – Tōru Hashimoto, Japanese lawyer and politician
1970 – Melanie Paschke, German sprinter
  1970   – Emily Skinner, American actress and singer
1971 – Matthew Good, Canadian singer-songwriter and guitarist 
1973 – George Hincapie, American cyclist
1976 – Daniel Carlsson, Swedish race car driver
  1976   – Bret McKenzie, New Zealand comedian, actor, musician, songwriter, and producer
1977 – Sotiris Liberopoulos, Greek footballer
  1977   – Zuleikha Robinson, English actress
1978 – Nicole Scherzinger, American singer-songwriter, dancer, and actress  
1979 – Matthew Bode, Australian footballer
  1979   – Andy O'Brien, English footballer
  1979   – Marleen Veldhuis, Dutch swimmer
1980 – Katherine Jenkins, Welsh soprano and actress
1981 – Luke Branighan, Australian rugby league player
  1981   – Joe Johnson, American basketball player
  1981   – Nicolás Vuyovich, Argentinian race car driver (d. 2005)
  1981   – Shmuly Yanklowitz, American rabbi, author, and educator
1982 – Colin Jost, American comedian
  1982   – Dusty Hughes, American baseball player
  1982   – Lily Rabe, American actress
1983 – Aundrea Fimbres, American singer-songwriter and dancer 
  1983   – Jeremy Powers, American cyclist
  1984   – Aleksandr Shustov, Russian high jumper
1985 – Quintin Demps, American football player
1986 – José Manuel Jurado, Spanish footballer
  1986   – Edward Maya, Romanian singer-songwriter and producer 
1988 – Éver Banega, Argentinian footballer
1990 – Kim Little, Scottish footballer
  1990   – Yann M'Vila, French footballer
1991 – Suk Hyun-jun, South Korean footballer
  1991   – Kawhi Leonard, American basketball player
  1991   – Addison Timlin, American actress
1993 – Harrison Gilbertson, Australian actor
1994 – Camila Mendes, American actress and model
1996 – Joseph Manu, New Zealand rugby league player
1998 – Michael Porter Jr., American basketball player
2001 – Aaron Schoupp, Australian rugby league player
2003 – Jude Bellingham, English footballer
2006 – Sam Lavagnino, American child voice actor

Deaths

Pre-1600
 226 – Cao Pi, Chinese emperor (b. 187)
 884 – Yang Shili, general of the Tang Dynasty
 976 – Gero, archbishop of Cologne
1059 – Bernard II, Duke of Saxony (b. 995)
1149 – Raymond of Poitiers, Prince of Antioch (b. 1115)
1153 – Óláfr Guðrøðarson, King of the Isles
1252 – Abel, King of Denmark (b. 1218)
1293 – Henry of Ghent, philosopher (b. c.1217)
1315 – Ramon Llull, Spanish philosopher (b. 1235)
1344 – Joan of Savoy, duchess consort of Brittany, throne claimant of Savoy (b. 1310)
1374 – Jan Milíč of Kroměříž, Czech priest and reformer
1432 – Janus of Cyprus (b. 1375)
1509 – Margaret Beaufort, Countess of Richmond and Derby (b. 1443)
1520 – Moctezuma II, Aztec ruler (b. 1466)
1575 – Baba Nobuharu, Japanese samurai (b. 1515)
1594 – Niels Kaas, Danish politician, Chancellor of Denmark (b. 1535)

1601–1900
1626 – Scipione Cobelluzzi, Italian cardinal and archivist (b. 1564)
1646 – Laughlin Ó Cellaigh, Gaelic-Irish Lord
1725 – Arai Hakuseki, Japanese philosopher, academic, and politician (b. 1657)
1729 – Edward Taylor, American-English poet, pastor, and physician (b. circa 1642)
1744 – André Campra, French composer and conductor (b. 1660)
1764 – Ralph Allen, English businessman and philanthropist (b. 1693)
1779 – Anton Raphael Mengs, German painter (b. 1728)
1831 – Heinrich Friedrich Karl vom und zum Stein, Prussian minister and politician (b. 1757)
1840 – Lucien Bonaparte, French prince (b. 1775)
1852 – Henry Clay, American lawyer and politician, 9th United States Secretary of State (b. 1777)
1853 – Adrien-Henri de Jussieu, French botanist and academic (b. 1797)
1855 – John Gorrie, American physician and humanitarian (b. 1803)
1860 – Thomas Addison, English physician and endocrinologist (b. 1793)
1861 – Elizabeth Barrett Browning, English poet and translator (b. 1806)
1873 – Michael Madhusudan Dutt, Indian poet and playwright (b. 1824)
1875 – Ferdinand I of Austria (b. 1793)
1895 – Thomas Henry Huxley, English biologist (b. 1825)
1900 – Ivan Mikheevich Pervushin, Russian mathematician and academic (b. 1827)

1901–present
1907 – Konstantinos Volanakis, Greek painter and academic (b. 1837)
1919 – José Gregorio Hernández Venezuelan physician and educator (b. 1864)
1931 – Nérée Beauchemin, Canadian poet and physician (b. 1850)
1933 – Roscoe Arbuckle, American actor, director, and screenwriter (b. 1887)
1935 – Jack O'Neill, Irish-American baseball player and manager (b. 1873)
1936 – János Szlepecz, Slovene priest and missionary (b. 1872)
1940 – Paul Klee, Swiss painter and illustrator (b. 1879)
1941 – Ignacy Jan Paderewski, Polish pianist, composer, and politician, 2nd Prime Minister of Poland (b. 1860)
1942 – Paul Troje, German politician, Mayor of Marburg (b. 1864)
1949 – Themistoklis Sofoulis, Greek politician, 115th Prime Minister of Greece (b. 1860)
1955 – Max Pechstein, German painter and academic (b. 1881)
1960 – Frank Patrick, Canadian ice hockey player and coach (b. 1885)
1962 – Charles Lyon Chandler, American historian (b. 1883)
1964 – Eric Dolphy, American saxophonist, composer, and bandleader (b. 1928)
1967 – Primo Carnera, Italian boxer and actor (b. 1906)
  1967   – Jayne Mansfield, American actress (b. 1933)
1969 – Moise Tshombe, Congolese accountant and politician, Prime Minister of the Democratic Republic of the Congo (b. 1919)
1971 – Nestor Mesta Chayres, Mexican operatic tenor and bolero vocalist (b. 1908)
1975 – Tim Buckley, American singer-songwriter and guitarist (b. 1947)
1978 – Bob Crane, American actor (b. 1928)
1979 – Lowell George, American singer-songwriter, guitarist, and producer (b. 1945)
1980 – Jorge Basadre, Peruvian historian (b. 1903)
1981 – Russell Drysdale, English-Australian painter (b. 1912)
1982 – Pierre Balmain, French fashion designer, founded Balmain (b. 1914)
  1982   – Henry King, American actor, director, producer, and screenwriter (b. 1886)
1986 – Frank Wise, Australian politician, 16th Premier of Western Australia (b. 1897)
1990 – Irving Wallace, American author and screenwriter (b. 1916)
1992 – Mohamed Boudiaf, Algerian soldier and politician, President of Algeria (b. 1919)
1993 – Héctor Lavoe, Puerto Rican-American singer-songwriter (b. 1946)
1994 – Kurt Eichhorn, German conductor and educator (b. 1908)
1995 – Lana Turner, American actress (b. 1921)
1997 – William Hickey, American actor (b. 1927)
  1997   – Marjorie Linklater, Scottish campaigner for the arts and environment of Orkney (b. 1909)
1998 – Horst Jankowski, German pianist and composer (b. 1936)
1999 – Karekin I, Syrian-Armenian patriarch (b. 1950)
  1999   – Allan Carr, American screenwriter and producer (b. 1937)
2000 – Vittorio Gassman, Italian actor and director (b. 1922)
  2000   – Jane Birdwood, Baroness Birdwood, Canadian-English publisher and politician (b. 1913)
2002 – Rosemary Clooney, American singer and actress (b. 1928)
2003 – Katharine Hepburn, American actress (b. 1907)
2004 – Bernard Babior, American physician and biochemist (b. 1935)
  2004   – Alvin Hamilton, Canadian lieutenant and politician, 18th Canadian Minister of Agriculture (b. 1912)
2006 – Fabián Bielinsky, Argentinian director and screenwriter (b. 1959)
  2006   – Lloyd Richards, Canadian-American theatre director, actor, and dean (b. 1919)
  2006   – Randy Walker, American football player and coach (b. 1954)
2007 – Fred Saberhagen, American soldier and author (b. 1930)
  2007   – Joel Siegel, American journalist and critic (b. 1943)
2009 – Joe Bowman, American, target shooter and boot-maker (b. 1925)
2011 – K. D. Sethna,  Indian poet, scholar, writer, philosopher, and cultural critic (b. 1904) 
2012 – Yong Nyuk Lin, Singaporean politician, Singaporean Minister of Health (b. 1918) 
  2012   – Vincent Ostrom, American political scientist and academic (b. 1919)
  2012   – Juan Reccius, Chilean triple jumper (b. 1911)
  2012   – Floyd Temple, American baseball player, coach, and manager (b. 1926)
2013 – Peter Fitzgerald, Irish footballer and manager (b. 1937)
  2013   – Jack Gotta, American-Canadian football player, coach, and manager (b. 1929)
  2013   – Margherita Hack, Italian astrophysicist and author (b. 1922)
  2013   – Gilma Jiménez, Colombian politician (b. 1956)
2014 – Damian D'Oliveira, South African cricketer (b. 1960)
  2014   – Dermot Healy, Irish author, poet, and playwright (b. 1947)
2015 – Hisham Barakat, Egyptian lawyer and judge (b. 1950)
  2015   – Josef Masopust, Czech footballer and coach (b. 1931)
  2015   – Charles Pasqua, French businessman and politician, French Minister of the Interior (b. 1927)
2016 – Jan Hettema, Springbok cyclist and five times South African National Rally Champion (b. 1933)
2017 – Louis Nicollin, French entrepreneur and chairman of Montpellier HSC from 1974 to his death (b. 1943)
  2017   – Dave Semenko, Canadian ice hockey player (b. 1957)
2018 – Steve Ditko, American comic writer and illustrator (b. 1927)
2020 – Carl Reiner, American actor, director, producer, and screenwriter (b. 1922)
  2020   – Stepa J. Groggs, American rap artist (b. 1988)
  2020   – Hachalu Hundessa,  Ethiopian singer, songwriter (b. 1986)
2021 – Donald Rumsfeld, American captain and politician, 13th United States Secretary of Defense (b. 1932)

2022 – Hershel W. Williams, American Marine Corps warrant officer, last living Medal of Honor recipient from World War II (b. 1923)

Holidays and observances
Christian feast day:
Cassius of Narni
Feast of Saints Peter and Paul (Western Christianity), and its related observances:
Haro Wine Festival (Haro, La Rioja)
l-Imnarja (Malta)
June 29 (Eastern Orthodox liturgics)
Engineer's Day (Ecuador)
Independence Day (Seychelles), celebrates the independence of Seychelles from the United Kingdom in 1976.
Veterans' Day (Netherlands)
National Statistics Day (India)

References

External links

 
 
 

Days of the year
June